eClerx Services Ltd. is an Indian IT consulting and outsourcing multinational company based in Mumbai and Pune engaged in providing solutions to Fortune 500 companies business process management, automation and analytics services . eClerx is a public limited company whose shares are listed on the Bombay Stock Exchange and National Stock Exchange of India. The company listed on the bourses on Monday, 31 December 2007.

History 
EClerx was founded in year 2000 for providing services relating to business process management, automation and analytics to companies engaged in providing financial services,retail, communications,media & entertainment,fashion, manufacturing, travel & leisure and technology companies.

As of May 2022, its total headcount was reported as 14,800.

EClerx was granted approval by SEBI for buy back of its shares for Rs 3030 million.

Acquisitions and operations 
In April 2012, eClerx acquired Agilyst Inc to grow its footprint in the U.S. cable and telecom industry. On 31 March 2015, eClerx acquired  Creative Services Agency CLX Europe, for a total purchase consideration of up to EUR 25 million.

In December 2020, it entered into agreement to purchase US-based company engaged in providing digital marketing and back office services, Personiv.

References

Companies based in Mumbai
Software companies based in Mumbai
Software companies established in 2000
Indian companies established in 2000
2000 establishments in Maharashtra
Companies listed on the National Stock Exchange of India
Companies listed on the Bombay Stock Exchange